Anukulchandra Chakravarty (14 September 1888 – 27 January 1969), popularly known as Sree Sree Thakur, was a physician, a philosopher, a spiritual leader and the founder of Satsang, in Deoghar. He was born in a Brahmin family

Early life and service

Sivachandra Chakravarty and Monomohini Devi were his father and mother respectively. As a young medical student in Calcutta, Anukulchandra started serving and treating the slum dwellers in 1911. After six years of study, he came back to Himaitpur and began to practice medicine.

In 1913, Anukulchandra was spiritually initiated by his mother. After his initiation, he along with his friends and companions started doing intense kirtan. During kirtan, he often went into a state of trance, fell on the ground unconsciously and uttered messages in that condition. His going into trance during kirtan, delivering holy messages during trance and the devotion of those around him started attracting many more people. As a number of people came to his village to visit him began to settle permanently, gradually his village home was converted into an ashram.

Anukulchandra Chakravarty's service to the people as a doctor, his speaking in tongues in a state of trance as well as his advice and guidance to his followers helped him secure a position as a religious leader. The personality, life and teachings of Thakur Anukulchandra mediates between science and spirituality, personal affirmation and self-transformation, individualism and social commitment has put him in the class of prophets or avatars of the Indian religious tradition. His devotees address him as Yuga Purushottam or the Prophet of the modern age.

Death
Chakravarty died on 27 January 1969. The Government of India released a commemorative postage stamp, in 1987.

References

Other sources

 
 
 
 

1888 births
1969 deaths
19th-century Hindu religious leaders
20th-century Hindu religious leaders
19th-century Bengalis
20th-century Bengalis
Bengali Hindus
Founders of new religious movements
Hindu mystics
20th-century Hindu philosophers and theologians
Hindu revivalists
Indian Hindu spiritual teachers
Spiritual practice
People from Pabna District